Fresh Aire III is the third album by the new-age musical group Mannheim Steamroller. It was originally released in 1979 on American Gramaphone. Each of the first four Fresh Aire albums is based on a season; Fresh Aire IIIs theme is summer. The opening track, Toccata, was played behind station IDs for OEPBS until 1986.

Track listing
All tracks by Chip Davis

"Toccata" – 4:36
"Small Wooden Bach'ses" – 2:41
"Amber" – 2:47
"Mere Image" – 6:51
"Morning" – 2:54
"Interlude 6" – 2:51
"The Cricket" – 2:44
"The Sky" – 5:01
"Midnight on a Full Moon" – 3:16

Personnel
Jackson Berkey - piano, harpsichord, synthesizer, clavichord, Fender Rhodes, tack piano, toy piano
Eric Hansen - bass
Chip Davis - drums, recorders, toys, recording of a cricket on "The Cricket"
Ron Cooley - guitars
Ray Still, Bob Jenkins - oboe
Dave Kappy - French horn
Omaha Strings
Kansas City Strings

References

1979 albums
3
American Gramaphone albums